Shazam Sergeyevich Safin (born 17 April 1932 – 1985) was a Soviet wrestler of Tatar heritage who competed in the 1952 Summer Olympics. He was born in Kochki-Pozharki, Nizhny Novgorod.

At the USSR championship-1952 Shazam Safin took the third place. According to the classification of that period, this result was not high enough for the title of master of sports to be conferred upon the athlete. To receive the "master of sports" title, the athlete was either to win the USSR national championship or to take second place. However, Safin, a first-grade wrestler, got included into the USSR Olympic team and successfully appeared at the XV Olympic Games winning the gold medal. In final fight he won famous Swedish wrestler Gustav Freij. In the 1953 World Championship in Naples (Italy), Safin received the bronze medal, having lost points to Finnish athlete Lehton. The world champion title in the 67 kg weight class was gained by Frei.

References
 Shazam Safin's profile at Sports Reference.com
 V.S. BELOV Greco-Roman Wrestling. Lines from History
 Biography of Shazam Safin 

1932 births
1985 deaths
Soviet male sport wrestlers
Olympic wrestlers of the Soviet Union
Wrestlers at the 1952 Summer Olympics
Russian male sport wrestlers
Olympic gold medalists for the Soviet Union
Olympic medalists in wrestling
Tatar people of Russia
World Wrestling Championships medalists
Medalists at the 1952 Summer Olympics
Tatar sportspeople
Sportspeople from Nizhny Novgorod